Jack Siegfried Ryder (born 21 September 1981) is an English actor, best known for playing Jamie Mitchell in the BBC One soap opera EastEnders from 1998 to 2002. He has subsequently established himself as a film and theatre director.

Early life
Ryder was born in Woolwich, London, in 1981. His father is Jack Hues (real name Jeremy Allan Ryder), the founder of 1980s New Wave band Wang Chung.

Career
On leaving EastEnders in 2002, Ryder, then aged 21, performed as Justin Timberlake on Celebrity Stars in Their Eyes (which he won), appeared in the pantomime Sleeping Beauty at the Marlowe Theatre in Canterbury and was cast in a recurring role on Five's Family Affairs which he pulled out of when he learned that the series was soon to be axed. In 2004, he played a role in the ITV crime drama MIT: Murder Investigation Team and appeared in a play broadcast on BBC Radio 4.

In 2006, Ryder starred in the British film Popcorn which was released in the spring of 2007. Ryder was due to become a regular character in the then-new ITV1 daytime series The Royal Today, a contemporary spin-off of The Royal, but he subsequently withdrew from playing the role.

In 2007, aged 26, Ryder appeared in the play The Safari Party by Tim Firth and in Kenneth Branagh's production of The Play What I Wrote which toured the UK extensively.

In spring 2008, he was in Christopher Luscombe's production of Alan Bennett's play Single Spies playing opposite Nigel Havers. Then Ryder played Romeo in Michael Bogdanov's production of Romeo and Juliet  with Sara Lloyd-Gregory as Juliet.

In October 2008, Ryder joined The Archers as Ryan.

From 2009, Ryder played the photographer Laurence in the West End production of Calendar Girls at the Noël Coward Theatre, where he was also the assistant director.  He currently continues as associate director of Calendar Girls, responsible for all theatre productions world-wide.

In December 2010, Ryder wrote and directed his first short film, an adaptation of Mary Grace Dembeck's short story Act of Memory starring Claire Skinner, Owen Teale and Anna Massey which was shot on location in London and went on to be screened at the Cannes film festival in 2011.

In 2012, Ryder provided the English voiceover for Zael, the main protagonist in the video game The Last Story.

2013 saw Ryder become associate director of the stage play The Full Monty by Simon Beaufoy, which opened at the Lyceum Theatre Sheffield. 

In 2014, Ryder directed his second short film DOG and in July 2015 directed his first red button episode of Casualty for the BBC.

Ryder continued his relationship with The Full Monty as the director of the new touring production starring Gary Lucy which toured the UK through the autumn of 2015 into 2017.

Ryder returned to acting and played a new character Gareth in Kay Mellors' BBC drama In the Club which aired in May 2016.

In 2017, Ryder became the assistant director to Tim Firth on his and Gary Barlow's new musical "The Girls," opening at the Phoenix Theatre in London's West End on 21 February. As a result of his work on "The Girls" and his success on "The Full Monty" Gary Barlow and Take That asked Ryder to become the codirector with Kim Gavin on their new musical "The Band" which opened in September 2017.

In November 2018, it was announced that Ryder would join the cast of Holby City as a new Consultant General Surgeon named Evan Crowhurst. He made his debut in the episode "A Simple Lie".

On 28 May 2020, Ryder published Jack’s Secret Summer with Hachette Children's Group. Jack’s Secret Summer is Ryder's first book, as well as his début children's novel.

Personal life
Ryder married former Hear’Say singer turned actress Kym Marsh in St Albans, Hertfordshire, on 10 August 2002 and, after settling in St Albans, the couple had early difficulties and split for a short while before reconciling. In light of Marsh wanting a regular role in north-west-produced dramas and to be closer to her family, the couple moved to Manchester in 2004. It was announced on 20 March 2008 that Marsh and Ryder had decided to separate and then subsequently divorced.

Ryder now lives in London and France. He is a supporter of Newcastle United F.C. On 28 May 2020, he announced that he and his girlfriend were expecting their first child. Their daughter was born the following year.

References

External links
 

1981 births
Male actors from London
English male soap opera actors
Living people
People educated at Colfe's School
20th-century English male actors
21st-century English male actors
People from Woolwich